Victims of the Future is the fourth solo studio album by Northern Irish guitarist Gary Moore, released in February 1984. It was the first album to feature former UFO guitarist/keyboardist Neil Carter and bassist Bob Daisley. It was also the last to feature bassist Neil Murray, who rejoined Whitesnake, and drummer Ian Paice, who rejoined the reformed Deep Purple in 1984.

Background
Continuing Moore's path in the hard rock genre, Victims of the Future is a collection of straight-out rock n' roll anthems (such as "Teenage Idol" and "Hold On to Love"), a mournful love ballad ("Empty Rooms", which was later re-recorded by Moore for his 1985 album Run for Cover), a cover of the Yardbirds' "Shapes of Things", and two darker songs, featuring social and political commentary: "Victims of the Future" and "Murder in the Skies", the latter a protest against the Soviet Union's shooting down of Korean Air Lines Flight 007.

The album was released in North America with a different cover and altered content. The guitar solo intro to "Murder in the Skies" was removed, and "Devil in Her Heart", a single B-side, was added. "All I Want", omitted from the LP, was included as a bonus track on the cassette version.

Moore later dismissed Victims of the Future as "just one of my feeble attempts at heavy rock".

Track listing

UK release

US release

CD release

Personnel
Gary Moore – guitar, vocals
Neil Carter – keyboards, vocals
Neil Murray – bass guitar on tracks 1, 3, 7, 8
Mo Foster – bass guitar on tracks 4 and 6
Bob Daisley – bass guitar on tracks 2 and 5
Ian Paice – drums on tracks 1, 3, 4, 8
Bobby "Prime Time" Chouinard – drums on tracks 2, 5, 6, 7
Noddy Holder – additional backing vocals on "Shapes of Things"

Production
Jeff Glixman – producer, engineer
Steve Trevell – assistant engineer
Nigel Mills – basic tracks recording engineer
Dave Meegen – basic tracks recording assistant engineer
Ian Cooper – mastering
Martyn Atkins - artwork
Part Rock management - management

Charts

Album

Singles

References

1983 albums
Gary Moore albums
Albums produced by Jeff Glixman
Virgin Records albums